USS Quastinet (AOG-39) was a  acquired by the U.S. Navy for the dangerous task of transporting gasoline to warships in the fleet, and to remote Navy stations.

Quastinet was named by the U.S. Navy after Quastinet, a river in Massachusetts.

Construction  
Quastinet, sponsored by Mrs. E.S. Chappelear, was laid down 2 August 1944 as MC hull 1802 by East Coast Shipyard, Inc., Bayonne, New Jersey.  Constructed and converted concurrently, the vessel was launched on 24 September 1944.  Acquired by the Navy from the Maritime Commission on 28 October 1944, the ship was commissioned on 6 November 1944.

East Coast operations 
Following shakedown, Quastinet reported for duty to Commander, Service Force, Atlantic, 28 January 1945.

Decommissioning 
Following assignment to the 12th Naval District, Quastinet was decommissioned 16 April 1946 and struck from the Naval Vessel Register on 21 May.  She was transferred to the Maritime Commission on 9 September 1946.

References

External links 
  NavSource Online: AOG-39 Quastinet

 

Mettawee-class gasoline tankers
Type T1-M-A2 tankers of the United States Navy
Ships built in Bayonne, New Jersey
1944 ships
World War II auxiliary ships of the United States